"Infinity" is a song by Irish-British boy band One Direction from their fifth studio album, Made in the A.M. (2015). It was released as a single on iTunes and Apple Music on 22 September 2015. The song was at first announced as the third official single from the album, but was eventually scrapped in favour of "History".

Background
On 22 September 2015, One Direction announced the name of their album, Made in the A.M. and released "Infinity" as a promotional single along with the pre-order of the album. The cover art of the song also features a picture of One Direction's fragrance, Between Us. On 7 December, One Direction gave the first live performance of the song on BBC Radio 1. The band also performed the single at the final of The X Factor on 13 December 2015. The promo track was certified Gold in Italy for over 25,000 units in March 2016.

The song was supposed to be accompanied by a music video, but it was replaced by "History" as the album's third single, and the video was never finished.

Critical reception
Daniela Cabrera of Bustle wrote that she "heard traces of "Stop and Stare" by OneRepublic and a little bit of fellow Brit rockers, Keane and Coldplay" while adding that the song "is soaring, beautiful, and quite catchy" and that the "lyrics will hit home for anyone who's lost love".

Jason Lipshutz of Rolling Stone had a more negative review, stating that the "new ballad was limited by lyrics" and that "a unmemorable arrangement of kick drum and glistening guitar also helps “Infinity” sound hamstrung by its clumsy lyrics", but he complimented the group's vocals, stating that the band "sounds vocally accomplished on "Infinity" in spite of the absence of Zayn Malik".

Charts and certifications

Charts

Certifications

References

One Direction songs
2015 songs
2015 singles
Songs written by Jamie Scott
Songs written by John Ryan (musician)
Songs written by Julian Bunetta
Syco Music singles
2010s ballads